The Like Young were an American indie rock band from Chicago, Illinois, composed of Amanda and Joe Ziemba. The couple had been playing music together in various bands since 1997 (most notably Wolfie and Busytoby). They formed the Like Young in the spring of 2002, and were married in the same year.

Amanda played the drums and Joe played the guitar, bass, and occasionally keyboard; both sang, though Joe—who wrote most of the songs—took lead more often.

Early releases 
Later in 2002, they released their first album, a five-track EP entitled "Looked Up" Plus Four, with Kittridge Records. In the spring of 2003, they released their first full-length album, Art Contest, on Parasol Records to generally positive reviews.

Their next full-length album, So Serious, was released in the summer of 2004 on Parasol Records. Reviews for So Serious were more positive than for Art Contest, with some reviewers sharply contrasting the two. Tim Sendra of Allmusic wrote that "Art Contest was a slab of formulaic punk-pop bereft of inspiration and hooks...So Serious makes no radical changes but is about 100 percent better and less cute, more real."

Last Secrets and breakup 
Their final album, Last Secrets, was released in 2006 on both CD and vinyl by Polyvinyl Records.

On August 27, 2006, the Like Young announced their retirement citing the need to move on and make smart decisions. In the announcement Joe mentioned that the decision was a happy one. Joe soon returned to music and released Love at 30 in 2008 as Beaujolais; this record addresses the end of the Ziembas' marriage. Joe relocated to Los Angeles after 2009's Admirations.

In June 2011, Joe released a collection of tracks written and recorded for the Like Young from 2002 to 2006. The release, titled "Fifteen Demos," was released via his Bandcamp page. Of the release, Joe wrote, "I'm saying goodbye to The Like Young. Only this time, I'm doing so with a hug and a smile."

Discography
Albums
Art Contest (2003)
So Serious (2004)
Last Secrets (2006)
 Fifteen Demos (2011)

EPs
 S.T. Monroe / The Like Young (split single) (2002)
"Looked Up" Plus Four (2002)
The Timid EP (2005)
Six at Midnight (2005)

References

External links
Pitchfork Media Review of So Serious
Punknews.org Profile of The Like Young
Punknews.org review of Last Secrets
 

Indie rock musical groups from Illinois
Musical groups from Chicago
Rock music duos